The Curates' Augmentation Fund is an ecclesiastical charity set up in 1866 to provide extra income for those clergy in long term curacies, often in slum parishes or difficult terrain overseas.

Notes and references

Christian charities based in the United Kingdom
Religious organizations established in 1866
Christian organizations established in the 19th century
1866 establishments in England